Ida Ayu Kade Devie (born 7 November 1985), better known as Kadek Devie, is an Indonesian actress. She was born in Bandung, Indonesia.

Career
She started career at entertainment in 2003, when she participated at "Gadis Sampul" election and become one of Top Guest 2003 in Aneka Yess!! Magazine, a famous magazine for teen girls in Indonesia, especially in Jakarta.

Filmography

TV Series
 Cinta 2020
 Indahnya Karunia-Mu
 Celana Bulu Jeans
 Aku Cemburu (2006)
 Jangan Berhenti Mencintaiku (2005)
 Senandung Masa Puber
 Beningnya Cinta (2010)
 Baruak gadang (2011)

TV Movie
 Cowok Gue Pendek Bener
 Cowok Gue Pendek Lagi
 Jadikan Aku Pacarmu
 Ku Kejar Cintaku ke Bandung
 Kalo Cinta Ngomong Dong!
 3 Pelancong Cinta
 Pacar ke 17
 Manajemen Cinta 17
 Cinta Rasa Mocca
 Kawin Gantung
 Jadikan Aku Pacarmu
 Kamulah Cinta
 Hanna & Hilda High Heels
 Buat Gue Jatuh Cinta
 Cinta Tak Bersyarat
 Cinta Tanpa rekayasa
 Cinta Bikin Pusing
 Pacar Setengah Tiang
 Cinta Dikejar Jarum Jam
 Cinta Anak Petinju
 Bajaj Cinta Si Laura
 Pacar Bayaran
 Bu Lurah Idaman Hati

Endorsements
Fuji Film
Esia
Easy Splash Cologne
Fanbo (icon)

External links
 Profile at Showbiz.liputan6.com 
News at Showbiz.liputan6.com 

1985 births
Balinese people
Indonesian Hindus
Indonesian television actresses
Living people
People from Bandung
Actresses from West Java